Pernille Harder may refer to:
Pernille Harder (badminton) (born 1977), Danish badminton player
Pernille Harder (footballer) (born 1992), Danish footballer